The Worshipful Company of Cutlers is one of the ancient Livery Companies of the City of London. It ranks 18th in the order of precedence of the Companies.

The trade of knife-making and repairing was formed in the thirteenth century as a guild; the Cutlers' Company received a Royal Charter in 1416. The Company, like many other City Livery Companies, no longer has a strong connection with its trade, which for the most part relocated north to Sheffield, where a similar association, the Company of Cutlers in Hallamshire was established. Thus, the Livery Company remains primarily as a charitable institution. The Company funds and administers a variety of educational initiatives such as scholarships and awards.

Heraldry

John Stowe stated that the arms of the Cutlers of London ("Gules, three pairs of swords in saltire argent hilts and pommels or) were granted in 1476 by Thomas Holme, Clarenceux King of Arms, and the crest "an elephant bearing a castle" by Robert Cooke (c.1535-1592/3), Clarenceux.  The supporters are two elephants.

It has been claimed the elephant and castle crest gave rise to a public house displaying the crest as its sign, on the site of an old cutlers' inn at Newington, south London, and that this in turn gave its name to the area known as Elephant and Castle. However the Cutlers' Company has advised it did not own property in the area (3). Meanwhile a historian of the Elephant and Castle states 'elephant and castle' was a common public house name, and the eponymous district of London simply acquired its name in a happenstance fashion from that establishment (4).

The Company's motto was originally Pervenir a bonne foy, which later became Pour parvenir a bonne foy, an Anglo-Norman phrase meaning To succeed through good faith.

The Company's livery hall is located on a site in Warwick Lane once occupied by the Royal College of Physicians, near Newgate Street. It was designed by T. Tayler Smith, the Company's surveyor, and was opened in 1888. It is a brick building, the façade decorated with a terracotta frieze depicting the processes of knife-making by the sculptor Benjamin Creswick, who had worked as a knife-grinder in Sheffield.

Gallery

References

3. Email to co-author 8 January 2021.
4. Stephen Humphrey, Elephant & Castle: A History, Amberley Publishing 2013.

External links
 The Cutlers' Company
 

Livery companies
1416 establishments in England
Corporatism
Companies of medieval England
Charities based in London
History of the City of London
Cutlers